Lovern is an unincorporated community in Mercer County, West Virginia, United States.

Lily Lovern, an early postmaster, gave the community her name.

References

Unincorporated communities in Mercer County, West Virginia
Unincorporated communities in West Virginia